Román Gabriel Vega (born 1 January 2004) is an Argentine professional footballer who plays as a left-back for Spanish team Barcelona Atlètic, on loan from Argentine Primera División club Argentinos Juniors.

Career
Vega started his career with Argentine top flight side Argentinos Juniors. In 2022, he was sent on loan to Barcelona Atlètic in the Spanish third tier.

References

External links
 
 

2004 births
Argentine Primera División players
Argentinos Juniors footballers
Association football defenders
Expatriate footballers in Spain
FC Barcelona Atlètic players
Living people